The Royal Victoria Dock is the largest of three docks in the Royal Docks of east London, now part of the redeveloped Docklands.

History 

Although, the structure was in place in the year 1850, it was opened in 1855, on a previously uninhabited area of the Plaistow Marshes. It was the first of the Royal Docks and the first London dock to be designed specifically to accommodate large steam ships. It was also the first to use hydraulic power to operate its machinery and the first to be connected to the national railway network, via the Eastern Counties and Thames Junction Railway section of what is now the North London line. It was initially known as "Victoria Dock"; the prefix "Royal" was granted in 1880.

The dock was connected to the national rail network via a line which ran between Canning Town and North Woolwich. When the Royal Dock was first built, the railway cut along the docks; to correct this, a swing bridge over the entrance to the dock was built. This however, slowed journey time, and so a new line was built in 1855, to take the route around the north side of the dock to Silvertown, and a station at Custom House opened where it re-connected with the original line. The older southern line was kept to serve local factories, where it was known as the Silvertown Tramway.

The Royal Victoria Dock consisted of a main dock and a basin to the west, providing an entrance to the Thames on the western side of the complex. The dock was deeply indented with four solid piers, each 152 m long by 43 m wide, on which were constructed two-storey warehouses. Other warehouses, granaries, shed and storage buildings surrounded the dock, which had a total of 3.6 km of quays.

The dock was an immediate commercial success, as it could easily accommodate all but the very largest steamships. By 1860, it was already taking over 850,000 tons of shipping a year – double that of the London Docks, four times that of St Katharine Docks and 70% more than the West India Docks and East India Docks combined. It was badly damaged by German bombing in the Second World War, but experienced a resurgence in trade following the war. From the 1960s onwards, the Royal Victoria experienced a steady decline – as did all of London's other docks – as the shipping industry adopted containerisation, which effectively moved traffic downstream to Tilbury. It finally closed to commercial traffic along with the other Royal Docks in 1981.

In 1988, the then-dilapidated site was chosen by French electronic musician Jean-Michel Jarre as the site for one of his signature large-scale concerts, eventually titled Destination Docklands. The area also inspired him to write the album Revolutions specifically for the event.

The Royal Victoria Dock experienced major redevelopment initiated by the London Docklands Development Corporation in the 1990s. Developments included Britannia Village, which was carried out by Wimpey Homes, the Peabody Trust and the East Thames Housing Group in the mid-1990s.

Most of the original buildings were demolished but a few historic warehouses survived. More recent development has included the Royal Victoria Dock Bridge completed in 1998, and the ExCeL Exhibition Centre, constructed on the north quayside, which opened in November 2000.

Events 
On 15 August 2009, the dock hosted the inaugural Great London Swim, a mass participation open water swim over a one-mile distance. The event has been held annually since then but on the first weekend in July. On 16 to 17 June 2018, the dock hosted the F1H2O Grand Prix of London won by Erik Stark. Britannia Village has its own Community Foundation.

Royal Victoria Dock is the starting location for the annual Docklands Head, a rowing head race hosted by Poplar Blackwall and District Rowing Club. The race starts under the Royal Victoria Dock Bridge and proceeds eastwards underneath Connaught Footbridge and Connaught Road Bridge, finishing at the eastern end of the Royal Albert Dock.

Gallery

See also 
 King George V Dock, London
 Royal Victoria Square

References

External links 
 Royal Docks Forum
 Britannia Village Residents Forum
 London Landscape TV episode (6 mins) about Royal Victoria Dock
 Royal Docks Information

Buildings and structures in the London Borough of Newham
Geography of the London Borough of Newham
London docks
Port of London